HUB International Limited is an insurance brokerage providing an array of property, casualty, risk management, life and health, employee benefits, investment, and wealth management products and services across North America. HUB has more than 375 offices across the United States and Canada and more than 10,000 employees. It is based in Chicago, Illinois.

HUB International was formed in 1998 with less than 300 employees and less than 50 Canadian offices. In early 2007, it was purchased by an investor group led by private equity firm Apax Partners in a going-private transaction.

Recent news
In August 2013, the firm was acquired by the private equity firm Hellman & Friedman for around $4.4 billion.

In March 2020, Hub International Limited and Morneau Shepell Inc. announced the sale of Morneau Shepell's benefits consulting practice to Hub. Also in March, Hub International Limited announced the acquisition of assets of Linton & Associates Insurance Agency. Terms of the deal were not disclosed.

In October 2021, Hub International's Specialty Program Group acquired healthcare liability insurance coverage provider, CM&F Group.

References

External links

Financial services companies established in 1998
Companies based in Chicago
Brokerage firms
Insurance companies based in Illinois